Medjugorje International Youth Festival, also known as Mladifest is an annual gathering of the Catholic youth organized in Medjugorje, Bosnia and Herzegovina between 1 and 6 August, to mark the birthday of Mary, mother of Jesus on 5 August, as claimed by the alleged seers of Marian apparitions. The festival was established in 1989 by two the Franciscan priests, Slavko Barbarić and Tomislav Vlašić.

History 

Mladifest was established in 1989 by the two Herzegovinian Franciscans – Slavko Barbarić and Tomislav Vlašić – in order to celebrate Mary's alleged 2000th birthday, as claimed by the alleged seers of Our Lady of Medjugorje. At the time, Barbarić was sentenced for disobedience to the Church and was illegally active in Medjugorje until 2000. Vlašić personally led the whole festival until 1991.

Every year, thousands of young people arrive in Medjugorje from all around the world. On average, Mladifest is visited by some 50 thousand people every year. Mladifest is the second-largest regular Catholic gathering of youth behind the World Youth Day.

At the 2020 gathering, Pope Francis sent a message to the attendees stating that the Virgin Mary is "the great model of a Church with a young heart, ready to follow Christ with freshness and docility" and that her example should "always fascinate us and guide us". In his address, the Pope never once mentioned the alleged apparitions nor cited any of the alleged messages of the Our Lady of Medjugorje.

Notes

References

News articles 

 
 
 
 

Youth events
Catholic youth organizations
Recurring events established in 1989
August observances
Christian festivals and holy days
Catholicism-related controversies
Catholic Church in Bosnia and Herzegovina

hr:Mladifest